The 1985–86 Cypriot Third Division was the 15th season of the Cypriot third-level football league. APEP FC won their 1st title.

Format
Fourteen teams participated in the 1985–86 Cypriot Third Division. All teams played against each other twice, once at their home and once away. The team with the most points at the end of the season crowned champions. The first three teams were promoted to 1986–87 Cypriot Second Division.

Point system
Teams received two points for a win, one point for a draw and zero points for a loss.

League standings

Sources

See also
 Cypriot Third Division
 1985–86 Cypriot First Division
 1985–86 Cypriot Cup

Cypriot Third Division seasons
Cyprus
1985–86 in Cypriot football